Caribbean La Amistad Conservation Area is an administrative area which is managed by SINAC for the purposes of conservation in the eastern part of Costa Rica, on the Caribbean coast. It contains several national parks, and a number wildlife refuges and other types of nature reserve.

Protected areas
 Banano River Basin Protected Zone
 Barbilla National Park
 Bonilla-Bonillita Lacustrine Wetland
 Cahuita National Park
 Cariari National Wetlands
 Hitoy Cerere Biological Reserve
 Jairo Mora Sandoval Gandoca-Manzanillo Mixed Wildlife Refuge
 La Amistad International Park (shared with Panama and Pacific La Amistad Conservation Area) 
 Limoncito Wildlife Refuge
 Pacuare-Matina Forest Reserve
 Pacuare River Forest Reserve
 Siquirres River Basin Protected Zone

References

Conservation Areas of Costa Rica